The United States Army long range surveillance detachment (LRSD) is organized as a detachment organic to the military intelligence battalion at division level for the purpose of long-range surveillance. The LRSD's are organized into a headquarters section, communications section (two base radio stations), and six surveillance teams. (Light division LRS detachments only have four surveillance teams.) The leaders are airborne and Ranger qualified. All other personnel in the detachment are airborne qualified.  Most active Army LRSDs were inactivated in September 2005, with the notable exceptions 173rd Airborne's LRSD which was deactivated in 2006 and the 82nd Airborne's LRSD, which was converted to Pathfinders in 2008, and most Army National Guard units were inactivated in September 2008; some were transferred to battlefield surveillance brigades and were reflagged and redesignated as Troop C within the brigade's cavalry squadron (reconnaissance and surveillance).  For example, the 151st Infantry Detachment (LRS) of the 38th Infantry Division became Troop C (LRS), 2d Squadron, 152d Cavalry Regiment, 219th Battlefield Surveillance Brigade. Two new National Guard Long Range Surveillance Companies were stood up in September 2009.

Headquarters section
This section contains the personnel necessary for command and control of the detachment.

Communications section
Paratroopers assigned to the Communications section ensure expeditious processing of all message traffic. The two base stations maintain communication with deployed teams and have the capability to deploy and operate radio-relay sites if needed. The section trains all personnel in the unit on proper communications procedures and operation of communications equipment. Personnel in the communications section also receive training on infantry tactics and reconnaissance and surveillance. Personnel assigned to the section can also attend Pathfinder, Air Assault, Ranger, and other military courses. At times, members of the section will augment LRS teams on certain operations or due to manpower shortages. The LRS-D may be augmented with a base station from the Corps LRS-C if dictated by operational requirements, equipment shortages, or maintenance problems.

Surveillance teams (LRS teams)
Each team consists of a team leader, an assistant team leader, senior scout observer, scout observer, ARTO and a RATELO. The teams obtain and report information about enemy forces within their assigned areas. They can operate independently with little or no external support in all environments. They are lightly armed with limited self-defense capabilities. To be easily transportable, they are equipped with lightweight, man-portable equipment. The teams are limited by the amount of weight that they can carry or cache. The rucksacks used by the 82nd LRSD in Afghanistan during OEF VIII often weighed over 100lbs. All team members are airborne qualified, and teams are HALO or Amphibious designated and qualified, ensuring all means of insertion are available to the commander when planning operations.

See also
Long-range reconnaissance patrol
Long-range surveillance
Long-range surveillance company
Reconnaissance and Surveillance Leaders Course

External links
US Army doctrine FM 7-93
Military intelligence collection
Detachments of the United States Army
Army reconnaissance units and formations